"Things We Lost in the Fire" is the sixth single by British  band Bastille from their debut studio album Bad Blood. The song was released as a 7-inch single and as a digital download on 23 August 2013. It received radio airplay on both BBC Radio 1 and BBC Radio 2, two of the most popular British national stations. It reached number 28 in the UK Singles Chart on 15 September 2013. The song was featured in an episode of The Vampire Diaries. In September 2014 the song was used as a trailer song for EastEnders. It was also used as a name of a Grey's Anatomy episode in 2015.

Music video
A music video to accompany the release of "Things We Lost in the Fire" was shot in Kėdainiai in Lithuania. It was directed by Naor Aloni, and released on 13 July 2013.

Track listing
Digital download
 "Things We Lost in the Fire" – 4:00
 "Icarus" – 3:14
 "Things We Lost in the Fire" (TORN Remix) – 5:23
 "Things We Lost in the Fire" (Tyde Remix) – 4:50
 "Things We Lost in the Fire" (music video) – 4:15
 "Things We Lost in the Fire" (Live from Queens' College, Cambridge) (music video) – 4:06

7" single
 "Things We Lost in the Fire" – 4:00
 "Icarus" (Live from Queens' College, Cambridge) – 3:14

Charts and certifications

Weekly charts

Year-end charts

Certifications

Release history

References

2013 singles
2013 songs
Bastille (band) songs
Songs written by Dan Smith (singer)
Virgin Records singles
Pop ballads